Elin Maria Katarina Johansson (born 5 August 1990) is a Swedish taekwondo athlete. She qualified for the 2012 Summer Olympics but lost against the Australian athlete Carmen Marton in the quarterfinal.

In June 2015 she won a bronze medal during the European Games in Baku.

She competed at the 2016 Summer Olympics, but lost her first match against Nigora Tursunkulova.

References

External links
 

Living people
1990 births
Swedish female taekwondo practitioners
People from Skellefteå Municipality
Taekwondo practitioners at the 2012 Summer Olympics
Olympic taekwondo practitioners of Sweden
Taekwondo practitioners at the 2015 European Games
European Games medalists in taekwondo
European Games bronze medalists for Sweden
Taekwondo practitioners at the 2016 Summer Olympics
European Taekwondo Championships medalists
Sportspeople from Västerbotten County
21st-century Swedish women